Joseph Schröter (14 March 1837 – 12 December 1894) was a noted German mycologist, doctor and scientist. He wrote several books and texts, and discovered and described many species of flora and fungi. He also spent around fifteen years, from 1871 to 1886, as a military doctor, particularly in the Franco-Prussian War, in places such as Spandau, Rastatt and Breslau, and rising to the rank of colonel.

Life 
In 1855 Schröter chose to study medicine in Breslau, Lower Silesia (Wrocław, Poland since 1945), but in 1856, he transferred to the Friedrich-Wilhelm Academy in Berlin, Prussia (Germany did not unite into a single nation state until 1871). 
In 1859 he earned his Doctor of Medicine degree. In the same year, he enlisted in the Prussian army, serving as a doctor in the Franco-Prussian war. He occupied this post to the end of the war, in 1871, before being stationed at Spandau, and later Rastatt. For his efforts as a doctor, as well as the various other contributions he made to the military (particularly during the Franco-Prussian War), Schröter was promoted to the rank of colonel in 1880. He was then stationed at Breslau, where he had been schooled.
His career at the University of Breslau began six years later, in 1886, when he was appointed as a lecturer. He stayed at the university teaching for several years, and became a professor in 1890. He died in 1894, after returning from a scientific expedition to Turkey.

Genera described by Schröter 
Schröter described many genera, including:
Aleurodiscus
Ceratiomyxa
Clavulina
Daedaleopsis
Dicranophora
Hygrophoropsis
Plasmopara
Sclerospora
Sorosphaera
Synchephalastrum

See also 
List of mycologists
:Category:Taxa named by Joseph Schröter

Footnotes

References 
"Joseph Schroeter" Encyclopædia Britannica

1837 births
1894 deaths
German mycologists
19th-century German botanists
German military doctors
People from the Province of Silesia
People from Nysa County